Mercury Filmworks is a Canadian independent animation studio based in Ottawa, Ontario. The studio was originally founded in Vancouver by Clint Eland, the current CEO, in 1997. Mercury Filmworks has produced animated television series and feature films for a variety of companies, including Disney, Netflix, Amazon Studios, and Warner Bros. Its recent projects include Kid Cosmic, Centaurworld, Hilda, The Wonderful World of Mickey Mouse, and The Ghost and Molly McGee. The studio has won Emmy Awards for its work in several categories, most recently for Hilda.

Mercury has over 340 employees employed at its Ottawa location, and continues to show steady growth. In 2020, it was named one of the best offices in Ottawa by the Ottawa Business Journal.

History 
Mercury Filmworks was founded in 1997 in Vancouver by current Chief Executive Officer Clint Eland. The studio started with a small investment from friends and family, including Reg Eland, who became a partner overseeing finances from 1997 to 2002 and managing partner of the Vancouver studio from 2003 to 2006. 

In the late 1990s, technology was evolving to allow artists to paint and render images at a much faster pace and with greater and more consistent results. Mercury Filmworks was one of the first companies in North America to specialize in digital ink and paint services in Canada. 

In 2000, Mercury opened a studio location on King Street East in Toronto to satisfy a multi-year output deal for its services. Meanwhile, in its Vancouver studio, they produced D'Myna Leagues using digital ink & paint plus CG integration, creating the first Canadian animated television series to integrate 3D locations in a 2D series.

In 2004, Mercury moved its Toronto studio to Ottawa, where local animation director, Jerry Popowich, joined the company as a partner.

The studio was already a leader in the field of computer assisted traditional animation. However, in its Ottawa studio with the help of people like Director Christian Larocque, Rob Buchanan, Anthony Ng, Dave Merrit, Phil Lafrance, Graham Macdonald, Emma Gignac, and Craig Berry, it leveraged this to become one of the world's first companies to produce an animated television series entirely in one studio using the beta version of Toon Boom Animation’s Harmony software. Using this software, they produced the series Mischief City for Shaftesbury Films and YTV. 

The following year, the studio animated Gerald McBoing-Boing. This production was widely regarded as a new benchmark for quality in digital animation. 

In 2007, the studio developed and co-produced Toot & Puddle with National Geographic for Nick Jr. This was the first use of advanced builds and rigging techniques resulting in a level of animation that was indistinguishable from hand drawn. This series set the new world bar for digital animation. Toot & Puddle was also one of Mercury's first proprietary series.

In 2008, Mercury Filmworks collaborated with Walt Disney Television Animation on Kick Buttowski: Suburban Daredevil. The series was the first full television series project with Disney and one of Mercury’s first hybrid productions where characters were animated interchangeably and indistinguishably in both 2D and 3D. The series was one of the first examples of character-based CG Assists in a long form series. 

The studio again collaborated with Disney on Jake and the Never Land Pirates in 2009. The animation project pushed advanced builds and rigging techniques to a new level. 

From 2012 to this day, Mercury Filmworks animates the Mickey Mouse shorts and television specials for Disney Television Animation, once again collaborating with Disney and Director Paul Rudish on the award-winning reinvention of the character. The shorts have been widely regarded as the new benchmark when it comes to making digital animation look indistinguishable from the highest quality hand drawn animation. 

2013 brought the fourth Disney-Mercury production, The Lion Guard, based on the theatrical animated film The Lion King. The series involved advanced builds and rigging and heavy use of CG integration techniques for character and location assists. The series set the standard for feature-quality animation in long form television animation.

Two years later, the studio produced Disney's Repunzel's Tangled Adventure, a television adaptation of another Disney theatrical animated film, Tangled. The production methodologies used in the production were built upon the innovative techniques developed for The Lion Guard, and pushed animation and character performance levels to a new high.

Mercury Filmworks has been producing Hilda for Silvergate Media and Netflix since 2017. The series is one of the first that didn’t push the bar in terms of process or technology. The artists involved focused on art, craft, and storytelling. The series has gone on to critical acclaim and is one of Netflix’s best and most successful animated series. It is widely referenced as a benchmark in storytelling.

Television series

Lighthouse Studios

Specials/shorts

Films

Theme parks

References

External links
 

1997 establishments in British Columbia
Canadian companies established in 1997
Companies based in Ottawa
Mass media companies established in 1997
Canadian animation studios
Irish animation studios